A ZBC of Ezra Pound is a book by Christine Brooke-Rose published by Faber and Faber in 1971.  It is a study of the work of Ezra Pound, focusing in particular on The Cantos.

In Chapter Six, Brooke-Rose gives an explanation of the prosody of Anglo-Saxon alliterative verse as Pound would have understood it, based on Sievers' Theory of Anglo-Saxon Meter.

The book is out of print but can be read online.

References

1971 non-fiction books
Ezra Pound
Books about literary theory
Faber and Faber books
Books about Ezra Pound